Kylie Risk (born 28 November 1973) is an Australian former long-distance runner. She competed in the 10,000 metres at the 1996 Summer Olympics and the 2000 Summer Olympics.

References

External links
 

1973 births
Living people
Athletes (track and field) at the 1996 Summer Olympics
Athletes (track and field) at the 2000 Summer Olympics
Australian female long-distance runners
Olympic athletes of Australia
Place of birth missing (living people)
Commonwealth Games medallists in athletics
Commonwealth Games silver medallists for Australia
Athletes (track and field) at the 1998 Commonwealth Games
20th-century Australian women
21st-century Australian women
Medallists at the 1998 Commonwealth Games